Jamie Warren (born April 8, 1961) is a country music singer-songwriter, and the most awarded independent male artist in the Canadian country music industry.

Biography
Jamie Warren took piano lessons when he was 5 years old, and guitar lessons at 8. When he was 14, he wrote his first song. After high school, he did airshifts local radio stations, but maintained his interest in singing. He won the Youth Talent Search at London's Western Fair, and was sent to Memphis, Tennessee to compete with other North American winners. This led Warren to a year performing at Libertyland amusement park in Memphis.

When Warren returned to Ontario, he began working with producer J. Richard "Rick" Hutt. His first single, "World of a Child," was released in 1984. Independently, he released six more singles in the 1980s, including "Take Me Home Mississippi," which peaked at No. 10 in 1985. Later that year, Warren won the RPM Big Country Award for Best New Artist. When his career slowed down, he took time off to start a family, writing and playing in his spare time.

In 1993, Warren began work on his first album release on his own record label, TooHip Music. The first single, "Ready to Run," was released in 1995 and peaked at No. 50 on the Canadian Country Singles chart. Warren wasn't originally planning to include the song on his album. Fallen Angel was released in 1996 in both Canada and the United States. While the album didn't perform well in the US, it was a success in Canada. Singles released from the album include "What Goes Around (Comes Around)," "Watching Her Sleep," and the 1996 top 5 hit "One Step Back."

Warren began work on his second album, Just Not the Same, in 1997. The album was released the following year on the heels of his top 10 single, "Cried All the Way Home." Four more singles from the album reached the Canadian top 20, including the top 10 singles "The Way Love Goes" and "What a Woman Wants to Hear." Country Magazine named Just Not the Same the Best Album of 1999. When the Canadian Country Music Association (CCMA) awards were handed out in 1999, Warren was named Independent Male Vocalist of the Year, and "Cried All the Way Home" was named Independent Single of the Year. Warren swept the 1999 Ontario Country Music Awards (OCMA), winning every award he was nominated for, including Male Artist of the Year, Single Release of the Year ("Cried All the Way Home"), Video of the Year ("Cried All the Way Home"), CD Release of the Year (Just Not the Same), and Songwriter of the Year. He also received nominations at the 1999 RPM Big Country Awards (Male Vocalist of the Year) and the Juno Awards (Best Country Male Vocalist).

2000 was another big year for Warren, with the top 20 single "Sunny Day in the Park." He was named Male Vocalist of the Year by the OCMA for the second year, and the Ontario Country Performer and Fan Association (OCPFA) awarded Warren Single of the Year for "Cried All the Way Home" and Songwriter of the Year for "Words You Can't Take Back." He was also nominated for Male Vocalist of the Year by the CCMA, the Junos and RPM. Warren won two awards, Single of the Year ("Sunny Day in the Park") and Songwriter of the Year ("Sunny Day in the Park") at the 2002 OCPFA Awards.

Warren's third album, Really, was released in 2003. Four singles were released from the project, "Without You," "What More Can You Say," "Reanne" and "Where's the Love," but they all missed the Canadian top 30. Warren released his greatest hits collection, Make Me Believe, in October 2005. The album included 14 of Warren's most successful singles, along with five new tracks. Four of those songs received airplay on Canadian country radio, "She Kissed Me," "I Saw Her Standing There," "You're My Everything" and the title track.

Warren's fourth studio album, Right Here Right Now, was released in April 2008.

Discography

Studio albums

Compilation albums

Singles

1984–2000

2001–present

Music videos

References and footnotes

External links
Jamie Warren Official Site
Jamie Warren Interview

1961 births
Living people
Canadian country singer-songwriters
Canadian male singer-songwriters